Charlotta Eva Schelin (born 27 February 1984) is a Swedish former professional footballer who most recently played as a striker for FC Rosengård of the Damallsvenskan. She made her debut for the Sweden national team in March 2004 and was appointed joint captain alongside Caroline Seger in October 2012. Schelin has represented her country in the 2005, 2009, 2013 and 2017 editions of the UEFA Women's Championship, as well as the 2007, 2011 and 2015 FIFA Women's World Cups. She also played at the Olympic football tournaments in 2004, 2008, 2012 and 2016.

In October 2014 Schelin became Sweden's all-time record goalscorer by scoring her 73rd international goal in a friendly defeat by Germany.

Schelin began her senior club career with Kopparbergs/Göteborg FC (then known as Landvetter FC) in 2001. She developed into a prolific goalscorer in the Damallsvenskan then made a lucrative transfer to Olympique Lyon in 2008, rejecting a competing offer from the American Women's Professional Soccer league. During her eight-season stay at Lyon she won eight consecutive Division 1 Féminine titles, five Coupes de France Féminine, three UEFA Women's Champions Leagues and was the top goalscorer in the 2012–13 and 2014–15 Division 1 Féminine seasons. In 2013, she became the first foreign UNFP Player of the Year. In 2016, she returned to Swedish football with FC Rosengård, departing Lyon as the French club's all-time record goalscorer with 225 goals in 225 appearances. She has been awarded Diamantbollen (the Diamond Ball), given to the Swedish player of the year, a record five times, including four consecutive times from 2011 to 2014.

On 30 August 2018, she announced her retirement due to chronic head and neck pain resulting from an injury suffered while playing for FC Rosengård in 2017.

Early life
Although Schelin was born in Stockholm, her family moved away from the capital when she was two years old. With father Kjell and mother Nina, she grew up in Kållered outside Gothenburg and began to play football for Kållereds SK along with her older sister, Camilla. She has also played for Hällesåkers IF and Mölnlycke IF. Schelin was also adept at sports including table-tennis, track and field, and snowboarding before opting to focus on football full-time. As a teenager, she developed problems with her spine and was advised to stop playing the sport. Schelin went through intensive strength training and recovered by the time she turned 17. She credited her sister and former teammate Camilla and Tina Nordlund as important role models for her.

Club career

Göteborg FC
In 2001, when she was 17 years old, Schelin made her debut in the Damallsvenskan for Landvetter FC, now known as Göteborg FC. Her debut season yielded eight goals in 19 appearances. After an injury in August 2002, she was out of the league for almost a year and a half, returning in June 2003. In 2004 Schelin was named Breakthrough Player of the Year after netting 14 goals in 15 games for Göteborg. In 2006, Schelin scored 21 goals in 21 league games. At the end of season Fotbollsgalan, she was named Forward of the Year, Player of the Year and Top Goalscorer. She was also shortlisted for the 2006 FIFA World Player of the Year and was recognised by Swedish referees with a special award for her sporting treatment of opponents and officials. In 2007, she retained her top scorer title by scoring 26 league goals. Despite persistent interest from leading Damallsvenskan clubs including Umeå IK and Linköpings FC, Schelin opted to stay at her hometown team. She ultimately played in over 120 league matches with Göteborg, establishing herself as one of the club's most prominent players.

Lyon

After the re-branding and re-launch of the new United States-based league, Women's Professional Soccer (WPS), Schelin declared that she would be interested in playing in the league. However, after the 2008 Summer Olympics, Schelin announced that she would instead be joining Division 1 Féminine club Olympique Lyonnais in France. Upon signing her contract, it was reported by Göteborgs-Posten that Schelin would be earning over 1 million kr (US$160,000) per year. The move to France was criticised in Sweden, as, although Lyon were a well-resourced club, the overall standard of the Division 1 Féminine was considered much weaker than the Damallsvenskan. On 24 September 2008, Schelin's American transfer rights were drafted by the Saint Louis Athletica in the 2008 WPS International Draft. She declined the chance to join WPS, citing her contract with Lyon as the primary reason. Saint Louis signed Schelin's compatriot Sara Larsson instead.

Schelin arrived in Lyon in poor condition, after a thigh injury disrupted her 2008 spring season with Göteborg and migraines and stomach aches afflicted her at the 2008 Olympic Games. When she told Lyon's coach Farid Benstiti that she could also play on the wing, he shook his head and replied that he had signed her to score goals. Alongside Brazil's Kátia Cilene Teixeira, Schelin formed a productive attack for Lyon as the club defended its French title and reached the 2008–09 UEFA Women's Cup semi-final, where they lost to FCR 2001 Duisburg. The following season, Schelin was afflicted by injuries and was ruled out of Lyon's 2010 UEFA Women's Champions League Final defeat by Turbine Potsdam with ligament damage.

Schelin did play in the 2011 final, as Lyon avenged the previous year's defeat to beat Turbine Potsdam 2–0 at Craven Cottage and secure their first continental title. She had scored nine times on Lyon's route to the final, including twice in the semi-final, to bring about what she termed "the proudest moment" of her career. Lyon won a domestic double in 2011–12 and retained their European title by beating Frankfurt 2–0 in the 2012 final at the Olympic Stadium in Munich. In 2012–13 Schelin was in the best form of her career and finished as Division 1 Féminine top scorer with 24 goals in 16 appearances. She was also named French Player of the Year for the first time, but missed out on a third successive Champions League winner's medal when Lyon lost the final 1–0 to Wolfsburg at Stamford Bridge. In May 2013 she signed a new three-year contract with Lyon, reportedly worth an annual 2 million kr.

In 2013–14 Schelin contributed 12 league goals to another domestic double but Lyon lost to Turbine Potsdam in the Champions League round of 16. Her form had slumped after a breakdown in her working relationship with coach Patrice Lair. She rebounded the following season, scoring Lyon's 1000th Division 1 Féminine goal in a 7–0 home win over Rodez on 16 November 2014. Her second goal in the same match drew her level with Sandrine Brétigny as Lyon's all-time record scorer. She finished 2014–15 as Division 1 Féminine top scorer with 34 goals in 21 games, but Lyon were upset by French rivals Paris Saint-Germain in the Champions League round of 16.

Towards the end of another successful season in 2015–16, Lyon announced that Schelin would depart the club at the end of her contract. Her final game for the club was the 2016 UEFA Women's Champions League Final; in which she scored in the penalty shootout win over Wolfsburg. With Lyon Schelin won eight consecutive Division 1 Féminine titles, five Cups and three Champions Leagues. She left as the team's all-time record goalscorer with 225 goals in 225 appearances. Schelin's 41 goals for Lyon in the UEFA Women's Champions League left her fourth in the competition's all-time top scorer list. She held the record for Champions League goals for a single club, since Anja Mittag (49), Conny Pohlers (48) and Marta (46) all accrued their totals with more than one club.

Rosengård
On 8 June 2016, Schelin was presented as a player for Swedish champions FC Rosengård, of Malmö. She rejected an offer to rejoin Göteborg FC because they were unable to offer Champions League football. Schelin made her Rosengård debut slightly earlier than expected, substituting in for the injured Nataša Andonova after 22 minutes of a league fixture against Djurgårdens. Schelin scored a 90th-minute goal to salvage a 2–2 draw.

International career

In March 2004 Schelin scored twice on her debut for the Swedish under-21 team, in their 6–0 win over the full Republic of Ireland national team in Dublin. She previously scored three goals in six appearances for Sweden's under-16 team and two goals in seven appearances for the under-18s.

Schelin made her senior national team debut for Sweden on 16 March 2004; a 3–0 Algarve Cup defeat by France. In the fifth place play-off against China, Schelin was praised for scoring in Sweden's penalty shootout win after a 1–1 draw. She had been called into the squad as a replacement for Sara Johansson who had flu. Schelin retained her place and represented her nation at the 2004 Summer Olympics in Athens. Throughout this period, Schelin endured injuries to the groin and hamstring, which required extensive rest. She was selected by coach Marika Domanski-Lyfors for UEFA Women's Euro 2005 in North West England. She entered play as a second-half substitute but failed to score as Sweden lost 3–2 to rivals Norway in extra time of the semi-final in Warrington.

Schelin was a key player in the 2006 edition of the Algarve Cup; leading Sweden to their third-place finish. She scored the only goal in the bronze medal victory over France. After overcoming her injury problems, Schelin was awarded the Diamond Ball as the country's best female football player. That same year, she was named the Forward of the Year in the Damallsvenskan. Schelin's success brought her to mainstream attention in her country and she was rewarded with selection to attend the 2007 FIFA Women's World Cup draw in China on behalf of Sweden.

At the World Cup in China, Schelin scored two goals in three matches (one start) but Sweden unexpectedly failed to progress out of their group. After that failure some experienced players retired and coach Thomas Dennerby gave Schelin and other younger players a more prominent role in the team. Back in China the following year for the 2008 Beijing Olympics, she contributed three goals in four games but the Swedes lost 2–0 to Germany in the quarter-final.

Schelin helped Sweden to a bronze medal position at the 2011 FIFA Women's World Cup in Germany and was named in the All-Star Team. She featured in Sweden's 3–1 semi-final defeat to eventual winners Japan in Frankfurt. Sweden secured third place by beating France 2–1 in Sinsheim, Schelin scoring her second goal of the tournament. Third place also ensured Sweden's qualification for the 2012 Olympic football tournament in London. Dennerby kept Schelin in Sweden's Olympic squad for London, where they lost to France in the quarter-finals. Schelin scored twice in four matches but felt Dennerby's emphasis on defence had left her isolated in Sweden's attack.

In October 2012, new national team coach Pia Sundhage decided that Schelin and Caroline Seger would share the captaincy. Sundhage named Schelin in the squad for UEFA Women's Euro 2013, which Sweden hosted. Schelin finished as the tournament top scorer with five goals but was disappointed when Sweden lost 1–0 to Germany in the semi-final. She criticised the decision of Swiss referee Esther Staubli, who disallowed her equalising goal for a very questionable foul on Germany's centre-back Annike Krahn. Schelin's goal against Germany in October 2014's 2–1 home friendly defeat was her 73rd goal for Sweden, which broke the national record previously set by Hanna Ljungberg.

Schelin arrived at the 2015 FIFA Women's World Cup suffering from persistent knee pain. In Sweden's opening game she was unable to make any impression on Nigeria's defence, as the Africans recovered from 3–1 down to draw 3–3. In the team's 4–1 second round loss to Germany, goalkeeper Hedvig Lindahl made several saves to prevent an even heavier defeat for the disorganised Swedes.

With 165 caps and 84 goals, Schelin was the most experienced member of Sweden's 18-player squad for the 2016 Summer Olympics. When the team suffered a record 5–1 defeat by hosts Brazil in the second match, Schelin scored the late consolation goal and tried to lift the spirits of her demoralised teammates. In the quarter-final against the United States, captain Schelin had an extra-time goal incorrectly ruled out for offside and the match finished 1–1. She scored in Sweden's penalty shootout win. Sweden reached the gold medal match, but lost 2–1 to Germany. Schelin was disappointed by the defeat but proud to win a silver medal.

Matches and goals scored at World Cup & Olympic tournaments

Matches and goals scored at European Championship tournaments

International goals

Style of play
In June 2015 Schelin described herself as "not a typical center-forward" as she likes to drop deep or go wide in order to find space: "I always think of the collective because the danger can come from all players. Even if I do not score, I pass, I run to attract defenders. In the end, I want to win." She attributes her unselfish play to her upbringing in communal Swedish culture. After moving to Lyon, her instinct to pass to better-placed teammates annoyed her coach Farid Benstiti, who wanted her to concentrate on converting chances herself. Sweden's former coach Thomas Dennerby felt that Schelin became more comfortable on the ball after moving to Lyon, but retained her pace and ability in one-on-one situations.

Schelin is capable of playing as a winger. But when Dennerby deployed her wide in the 2007 FIFA Women's World Cup, her Göteborg coach Martin Pringle called for her to be given a more central role: "she is too good a player to play out there". China's coach Shang Ruihua highlighted Schelin as Sweden's best player ahead of the countries' opening match at the 2008 Summer Olympics: "Schelin has fast pace and excellent technique, and few defenders could keep up with her." Although tall and slender, she is also physically strong; England captain Steph Houghton rated Schelin as the "toughest opponent" of her career.

As a tall, skilful and prolific Swedish forward, Schelin has frequently drawn comparison with the contemporary male footballer Zlatan Ibrahimović. Former Denmark national team manager Peter Bonde branded Schelin "the female Zlatan" in 2005. In December 2013, Ibrahimović made an outspoken rejection of any comparison: "I was asked [by Swedish media] in the summer who was the better player, me or Lotta Schelin. You're kidding me, right? When I've broken all these records, this goal record, the goals in the national team, who shall I compare it to? Shall I compare it to whoever has the record, or the ladies?" Schelin's national team coach Pia Sundhage described his comments as sad and boring. Johanna Frändén, a journalist specialising in coverage of Ibrahimović, noted Schelin's contrasting temperament: "She is polite, charming, she does not have the same arrogance".

Personal life
Schelin came out publicly as a lesbian in August 2018. She has been married to her wife Rebecca since 2018.

Statistics

Club
Updated 21 May 2018

Honours

Club
Lyon
Division 1 Féminine: Winner 2008–09, 2009–10, 2010–11, 2011–12, 2012–13, 2013–14, 2014–15, 2015–16
Coupe de France Féminine: Winner 2011–12, 2012–13, 2013–14, 2014–15, 2015–16
UEFA Women's Champions League: Winner 2010–11, 2011–12, 2015–16
International Women's Club Championship: Winner 2012
Valais Women's Cup: Winner 2014

FC Rosengård
 Svenska Cupen: Winner 2016

Country

Sweden
2007 FIFA Women's World Cup: Group stage
2011 FIFA Women's World Cup: Third place
2015 FIFA Women's World Cup: Round of 16
2004 Summer Olympics in Athens: Fourth place
2008 Summer Olympics in Beijing: Quarter-final
2012 Summer Olympics in London: Quarter-final
2016 Summer Olympics in Rio: Runner-up
UEFA Women's Euro 2005: Semi-finals
UEFA Women's Euro 2009: Quarter-final
UEFA Women's Euro 2013: Semi-finals
UEFA Women's Euro 2017: Quarter-final
Algarve Cup (Participated from 2004 to 2015): Winner 2009

Sweden U19
 UEFA Women's Under-19 Championship: Group stage 2002

Sweden U17
 Nordic Cup: Runner-up 2001

Individual

2004: Sweden Breakthrough Player of the Year
2006: Diamantbollen Winner, Forward of the Year, Won the Swedish Premier Division, MVP of Kopparbergs/Göteborg FC.
2006: Topscorer in Damallsvenskan
2007: Topscorer in Damallsvenskan
2011: FIFA Women's World Cup All Star Team
2011: Diamantbollen Winner, Forward of the Year
2012: Diamantbollen Winner
2013: Best player in France
2013: Topscorer in Division 1 Féminine
2013: Golden Boot UEFA Women's European Championship
2013: UEFA Women's European Championship All Star Team
2013: UEFA Best Women's Player in Europe Award Third place
2013: Diamantbollen Winner, Forward of the Year
2014: Diamantbollen Winner, Forward of the Year
2015: Topscorer in Division 1 Féminine
 All-Time Top Scorer Sweden women's national football team with 88 goals.

In popular culture

Television and film
Schelin featured in the Sveriges Television documentary television series The Other Sport from 2013.

In 2021 Schelin participated in the Swedish version of the South Korean game show Masked Singer as Jokern (The Joker).

References

Match reports

External links

 
 (archive)
 (archive)
Player French football stats at statsfootofeminin.fr 
Profile at Olympique Lyonnais
pre-2004 Olympic tournament interview with Lotta Schelin at SVT's open archive 

1984 births
Living people
Footballers from Stockholm
Footballers from Gothenburg
Swedish women's footballers
Women's association football forwards
BK Häcken FF players
Olympique Lyonnais Féminin players
FC Rosengård players
Damallsvenskan players
Division 1 Féminine players
Olympic footballers of Sweden
Sweden women's international footballers
Footballers at the 2004 Summer Olympics
2007 FIFA Women's World Cup players
Footballers at the 2008 Summer Olympics
2011 FIFA Women's World Cup players
Footballers at the 2012 Summer Olympics
2015 FIFA Women's World Cup players
Footballers at the 2016 Summer Olympics
FIFA Century Club
Medalists at the 2016 Summer Olympics
Olympic silver medalists for Sweden
Olympic medalists in football
Swedish expatriate women's footballers
Swedish expatriate sportspeople in France
Expatriate women's footballers in France
Lesbian sportswomen
LGBT association football players
Swedish LGBT sportspeople